Wonderin' is a tribute album featuring jazz-funk cover versions of Stevie Wonder songs. It was recorded by the ad hoc band Rollercoaster made up of leading UK session and jazz musicians from British jazz-rock bands of the 1960s and 1970s such as Soft Machine, Blue Mink and Nucleus.

It was released on Ronnie Scott's record label. Many of the Rollercoaster musicians later recorded the Soft Machine album, Land of Cockayne, and made up Soft Machine's live line-up which played a six-night residency at Ronnie Scott's in 1984.

Track listing 
"I Wish"
"Boogie On Reggae Woman"
"Higher Ground"
"Superstition"
"Mr. W." (Karl Jenkins)
"Living for the City"

Personnel 
 Ron Mathewson – bass
 Barry Morgan – drums
 Alan Parker – guitar
 Karl Jenkins – keyboards
 Mike Ratledge – keyboards
 Mike Pyne – piano 
 Dick Morrissey – saxophone
 Ray Warleigh – saxophone
 Chris Pyne – trombone 
 Derek Watkins – trumpet

See also
 Billboard Top Country & Western Records of 1952

References 

1980 albums
Stevie Wonder tribute albums